Monsieur Mallah is a supervillain in the . He is the gorilla servant of and, in time, the partner to Gorilla Grodd, and the Brain while serving as an enemy of the Doom Patrol and the Teen Titans.

Monsieur Mallah appears in the third season of the HBO Max series Doom Patrol, voiced by Jonathan Lipow.

Publication history
Monsieur Mallah first appeared in Doom Patrol #86 (March 1964) and was created by Arnold Drake and Bruno Premiani.

Fictional character biography

Origin
A scientist experiments on a captured gorilla from Gorilla City, raising his I.Q. to the genius-level of 178. He names the gorilla Monsieur Mallah and educates him for almost a decade before making him his personal assistant.

The Brain, explaining Mallah's origin in Doom Patrol #86

The scientist's colleague, Niles Caulder grows jealous of his work and arranges for the scientist to get caught in an explosion, which destroys the scientist's body. Only the brain survives, and Caulder plans on putting his brain in a robot body. Mallah rescues the scientist, taking his brain and transferring it to a computer network that keeps it functioning. Now known simply as the Brain, the scientist and Mallah gather together the criminal organization known as the Brotherhood of Evil in hopes of conquering the world and getting revenge on Caulder. They gained members like Madame Rouge, General Immortus, and Garguax.

Caulder, now known as the Chief, through a series of other accidents that he manipulated, forms the superhero group known as the Doom Patrol. Setting out to destroy the Chief's 'pets', the Brain, Mallah, and their Brotherhood become enemies with the Patrol. Their criminal activities also put them into opposition with the Teen Titans.

Doom Patrol
During Grant Morrison's Doom Patrol run, Mallah has the Brain placed in one of Robotman's bodies. In his new body, the Brain confesses to Mallah that he's in love with him. Mallah reveals that he feels the same way, and the two kiss. However, Robotman's body had developed sentience and vowed never to be enslaved by a brain again; when Mallah placed his lover in the body, he triggered a self-destruct mechanism, which explodes as they kiss.

The two later resurface (the Brain back to floating in a jar), with no explanation of how they survived the explosion. The Brotherhood begins raiding genetic research facilities to unlock the secrets of cloning and create a new body for the Brain, so he and Monsieur Mallah can resume their romance. After a short while the Brain's new clone body begins to break down, so he has Mallah rip off his head and put his brain back into another jar.

In the Salvation Run storyline, the Brain and Monsieur Mallah appear amongst the villains that were sent to the planet Cygnus 4019. The Brain and Mallah arrive at Joker's camp, and Mallah asks Gorilla Grodd to speak with him away from the others. Mallah proposes to Grodd that as fellow gorillas, the natural kings of the jungle, they should team up and, through their combined might, rule the entire place by themselves. Grodd laughs at Mallah for considering himself, an "absurd science experiment", comparable to "a proud child of Gorilla City". Mallah strikes Grodd and calls him a beast, causing Grodd to fly into a rage and try to kill him. Although Mallah also has a gun and shoots Grodd several times, Grodd still has the upper hand, and is about to kill Mallah when the Brain interjects, pleading for Mallah's life. Thinking better of it, Grodd picks the Brain up and beats Mallah to death with the Brain, smashing the Brain's protective hull in the process and killing him as well. Before breathing his last breath, Monsieur Mallah says he dies happy taking solace in that he and the Brain will finally be able to be together forever.

DC reboot
In September 2011, The New 52 rebooted DC's continuity. In this continuity, Mallah was a gorilla who was experimented on by a New England scientist named Ernst to increase his intellect. He treated Mallah like a friend and an assistant. When an explosion occurred in his lab, Ernst was badly burned and Mallah saved his life by preserving his brain. After becoming distrustful of humans, Brain took Mallah into attacking humans that they blamed for their plight. Then they raided LexCorp where they received a cyber optic nerve so that Brain can see. During a standoff with the Special Crimes Unit, Maggie Sawyer tried to talk them down and agreed to help them if they surrendered.

In an altered future, Brain and Monsieur Mallah appear assisting Gorilla Grodd in taking over the remains of Central City at the time when The Black had taken over most of the world. They end up capturing Animal Man and the heroes that are with him. Animal Man's group is saved by Frankenstein and his Patchwork Army who defeat most of the gorillas as a few of them are allowed to escape to tell the tale of their defeat.

DC Rebirth
In 2016, DC Comics implemented another relaunch of its books called "DC Rebirth", which restored its continuity to a form much as it was prior to "The New 52". The Brotherhood of Evil worked together on a narcotic element which is then distributed to the addict population of New York City. The designer drug, Bliss; in actuality was designed to put people in a fugue state so Brain could use their dormant mental capacity as a type of cloud space to expand his own intellect into godlike territories.

In record time, Brain and Monsieur Mallah spearheaded their opiate both from a purer sample that they created. And through faulty counterfeits fabricated by the rival underlife, both having purposely leaked the original formula on the black market, then enlisted the mercenary Cheshire to steal back their original concoction while furthering the goal of expanding Brain's intelligence.

As his acumen began to reach hyper-genius levels of intellectual capacity. The Brain began to physically transcend his mortal coil at varying percentages over time, 10-15% enabling him to solve unsolvable mathematic formulas while masking his and Monsieur Mallah's operation, 23% giving him power over climate change and weather patterns, 47% enabling natural disaster & cosmological force phenomena manipulation and so on and so forth. As his mental abilities increased more and more with time he situated ecological catastrophes as bait to lure his enemies in the Justice League towards various traps while he worked towards achieving transcendent consciousness.

His ascent to godhood also came with the side effect of nullifying his empathy; becoming personally distant from the humanistic coil such as relations and his dearest confidante. To that end, Mallah betrayed Brain to the Titans before he could reshape reality to his own ends, ending the threat he posed for good.

Year of the Villain
During the "Year of the Villain", Joker imprisoned Brain and Monsieur Mallah in an old fair ground at the time when The Batman Who Laughs was infecting people. Joker tortured them and left their care in Lex Luthor's hands in exchange for the knowledge to defeat The Batman Who Laughs..

Powers and abilities
Monsieur Mallah has inhuman strength, durability, speed, agility, reflexes, and intelligence, as well as a keen sense of smell. He usually carries a machine gun or any other firearms with him.

In other media

Television
 Monsieur Mallah appears in Teen Titans, voiced by Glenn Shadix. This version is irritable, overconfident, and typically prefers direct assaults via his brute strength over tactical prowess. He assists the Brotherhood of Evil in their plot to eliminate young heroes around the world, only to be defeated and flash-frozen by the Teen Titans.
 Monsieur Mallah appears in Batman: The Brave and the Bold, voiced by Kevin Michael Richardson. In the episode "Gorillas in our Midst!", he joins Gorilla Grodd and Gorilla Boss in forming G.A.S.P. (Gorillas and Apes Seizing Power) and replacing Gotham City's citizens with apes, only to be thwarted by Batman, Detective Chimp, B'wana Beast, and Vixen. In the episode "The Last Patrol!", Mallah and the Brain join forces with General Zahl, among other enemies of the Doom Patrol, to seek revenge on them, only to be defeated by Batman once more.
 Monsieur Mallah appears in Young Justice, voiced by Dee Bradley Baker. This version is a member of the Light in the first two seasons, during which he is eventually captured by the Team, and the Suicide Squad in the third season.
 Monsieur Mallah appears in the "Doom Patrol" segment of DC Nation Shorts, voiced by David Kaye.
 Monsieur Mallah makes non-speaking appearances in Teen Titans Go!.
 Monsieur Mallah appears in Doom Patrol, voiced by Jonathan Lipow. This version is a member of the Brotherhood of Evil. After helping the Brain steal Robotman's body, Mallah leaves the former.

Video games
 Monsieur Mallah appears in DC Universe Online, voiced by Leif Anders.
 Monsieur Mallah appears as a playable character in Lego DC Super-Villains, voiced by Peter Jessop.

Miscellaneous
Monsieur Mallah appears in Smallville Season 11 #9.

See also
 List of fictional primates

References

Animal supervillains
DC Comics animals
DC Comics supervillains
DC Comics characters who can move at superhuman speeds
DC Comics characters with superhuman senses
DC Comics characters with superhuman strength
DC Comics LGBT supervillains
DC Comics male supervillains
Fictional characters with superhuman durability or invulnerability
Fictional gay males
Fictional French people
Gorilla characters in comics
Characters created by Arnold Drake
Comics characters introduced in 1964
Doom Patrol
Suicide Squad members